The 2011–12 Combined Counties Football League season (known as the 2011–12 Cherry Red Records Combined Counties Football League for sponsorship reasons) was the 34th in the history of the Combined Counties Football League, a football competition in England.

Premier Division

The Premier Division featured three new teams in a league of 22 teams after the promotion of Chertsey Town to the Southern Football League:
 Farnham Town, promoted as runners-up in Division One.
 South Park, promoted as third-placed club in Division One.
 Windsor, newly formed after Windsor & Eton folded.

League table

Division One

Division One featured four new teams in a league of 18 teams: 
Bookham, relegated from the Premier Division.
South Kilburn, transferred from the Hellenic League.
Spelthorne Sports, promoted as champions of the Surrey Elite Intermediate League.
Guernsey, a newly formed team, and the first Channel Islands team ever to play in any mainland league.

League table

References

 League tables

External links
 Combined Counties League Official Site

2011-12
9